Kasidakari (Kashida, kashida - kari ) is an embroidery art associated with  Kashmir, Bihar, Punjab and Himachal.

Name 
Kashida is the local lingo for the embroidery. Kasidkari known as kashida - kari, is the Punjabi and Hindi for needlework. It is also known as  kasidakari.

Techniques and stitches 
Various stitches are employed for Kashida work such as darning stitch, stem stitch, satin stitch and chain stitch. The base material for Kashida is cotton, wool or silk in a variety of colours like white, blue, yellow, purple, red, green and black. The stitches may vary with the material to be embroidered. Do - rukha'l embroidery (Chamba Kasidakari) has characteristics of its own which differentiates it from other forms of embroidery in India.

Sozni 
The sozni stitch is used when uniformity is desired on both sides, like in choice.

Zalakdozi 
Zalakdozi employs hook or aari to fill-in motifs with chain stitch. The chain stitch done with a hook is found on chogas (cloaks) and rugs with long and flowing designs.

Zari thread 
Kashmiri couching using zari thread is a style of Kashida work in which a zari thread is laid on the fabric along a pattern and is held in place with another thread.

Use 
To decorate costumes, Phirens, shawls, handkerchief and various household items like bed covers, cushion covers, lampshades, bags and other accessories.

See also 
Chamba Rumal an embroidered handicraft that was once promoted under the patronage of the former rulers of Chamba kingdom.

References 

Needlework
Embroidery in India